An elevator (also called a lift) is a device for the vertical movement of goods or people, typically within a building.

It may also refer to:

Movement of things

Elevators (drilling rig), a device used for lifting the drill string on a drilling rig
Elevator (aeronautics), a control surface of an airplane used to control its attitude in pitch
Grain elevator, a structure for storing grain safely above ground level
Elevator (dental), a tool used in dental extractions to loosen teeth
Boat lift, sometimes called a boat elevator
Canal inclined plane, sometimes called a canal elevator
Bucket elevator, also called a grain leg, a mechanism for hauling flowable bulk materials vertically

Music
Elevator (band), a Canadian band
Elevator (The Rollers album), 1979
Elevator (Hot Hot Heat album), 2005
Elevator, a 1999 album by Titan
Elevator, a 2007 album by Room 2012
Elevator (EP), released in 2001 by Epicure
"Elevator" (Eminem song), 2009
"Elevator" (Flo Rida song), 2008
"Elevators (Me & You)", a 1996 song by OutKast from their album ATLiens
"Elevator", a song by Burning Brides from their 2001 album Fall of the Plastic Empire
"Elevator", a song by Box Car Racer from the 2001 album Box Car Racer
"Elevator", a song by David Archuleta from the album The Other Side of Down
"Elevator", a song by the Pussycat Dolls from their 2008 album Doll Domination
"Elevator", a song by Hawk Nelson from their 2013 album Made
"Elevator", a song by Edan Lui

Film and television
 The Elevator (1974 film), a film directed by Jerry Jameson
 "The Elevator" (The Twilight Zone), a 1986 television episode
 "Elevator (Space Ghost Coast to Coast)", an episode of Space Ghost Coast to Coast
 Elevator (1995 film), a 1995 Iranian film
 The Elevator, a 2001 film featuring Greg Lauren
 Elevator (2008 film), an independent 2008 Romanian film
 Elevator (2011 film), a film directed by Stig Svendsen

Other uses
The Elevator (newspaper), a historic Black owned newspaper based in San Francisco
The Elevator (story collection), a 1993 collection of stories by William Sleator
Elevators (computer game), computer game included in 1982 Beagle Bag package 
Elevator Gallery, an art venue in east London
Elevator Competition, an event for MBA students put on by the Babcock Graduate School of Management
Elevator, a type of gag bit for horses
The bar or thumb on a scrollbar in computing
Elevator Action, a 1982 arcade game by Taito.

See also

Elevation (disambiguation)
Elevator music
Elevator paradox
Elevator pitch
Elevator shoe
Elevator algorithm
Space elevator